Seeland may refer to:

Places
 Seeland, Germany, a municipality in the Salzlandkreis district, in Saxony-Anhalt, Germany
 Seeland (Switzerland) (Drei-Seen-Land), a region on the Swiss Plateau, Switzerland
 Seeland Region (Verwaltungsregion Seeland), an administrative region in Switzerland
 Seeland (administrative district), part of the Seeland administrative region, Switzerland
 Seeland, Carinthia, now known as Jezersko, Slovenia

Other
 Seeland-II-C, a Scandinavian C-bracteate
 Seeland Records, an independent record label created by Negativland in the 1980s
 "Seeland", a song from the album Neu! '75 by the German band Neu!

See also
Sealand (disambiguation)
Zealand (disambiguation)
Zeeland (disambiguation)